Romeo is an Italian origin surname. It may refer to:

 Antonia Romeo (born 1974), British civil servant
 Bernardo Romeo (born 1977), Argentine football player
 Massimiliano Romeo (born 1971), Italian politician
 Michael Romeo (born 1968), lead guitarist of Symphony X
 Nicola Romeo (1876–1938), Italian engineer and entrepreneur who owned Alfa Romeo in its early years 
 Paolo Romeo (born 1938), Cardinal Archbishop of Palermo, Italy
 Sebastiano Romeo (1931–1998), leader of the 'Ndrangheta Italian criminal organization
 Steve Romeo (born 1971), American ski mountaineer
 Terrence Romeo (born 1992), Filipino basketball player
 Tony Romeo (1939–1995), American songwriter
 Tony Romeo (American football) (1938–1996), American college and American Football League player
 Tony Romeo (reporter), American television and radio news reporter

Italian-language surnames
Surnames of Italian origin